Laurence Mark Wisefield (born 27 August 1952) is an English guitarist, best known for his contributions to Wishbone Ash during the 1970s and 1980s.

Early career
Prior to his stint in Wishbone Ash, Wisefield performed with the progressive rock band, Home. The group released three albums through Columbia Records between 1971 and 1974. Another member of Home, Cliff Williams, went on to find fame with AC/DC.

Wishbone Ash

Wisefield joined Wishbone Ash prior to their 1974 album There's the Rub, eventually leaving in the mid 1980s following the release of Raw to the Bone.

Post-Wishbone Ash
Following his departure from Wishbone Ash, Wisefield went on to perform with Tina Turner, Joe Cocker and Roger Chapman.

We Will Rock You
In 2002, Wisefield joined the musical cast of We Will Rock You. As well as performing live with the musical, Wisefield appeared on the 2002 cast recording, and accompanied the performance at the 2002 Party at the Palace to celebrate the Golden Jubilee of Elizabeth II.

Wisefield has regularly been a member of Tina Turner's touring band.

Wisefield is currently a member of the band Snakecharmer, along with ex-members of Whitesnake & Thunder.

References

Wishbone Ash members
1952 births
Living people
Slide guitarists
English rock guitarists
Musicians from London